Paranerita inequalis is a moth of the subfamily Arctiinae first described by Walter Rothschild in 1909. It is found in Bolivia, Peru, Brazil and Suriname.

References

Moths described in 1909
Paranerita